Muadianvita Machkaz Kazadi (born December 20, 1973) is a former American football linebacker. He played for the St. Louis Rams in 1997 and for the Montreal Alouettes in 1999.

References

External links
 SMU Mustangs bio

1973 births
Living people
American football linebackers
Tulsa Golden Hurricane football players
St. Louis Rams players
Montreal Alouettes players
Barcelona Dragons players
Democratic Republic of the Congo emigrants to the United States
Sportspeople from Kinshasa